The 11th Korea Drama Awards is an awards ceremony for excellence in television in South Korea. It was held at the Gyeongnam Culture and Art Center in Jinju, South Gyeongsang Province on October 2, 2018.

Nominations and winners
(Winners denoted in bold)

References

External links 
  

2018 television awards
Korea Drama Awards
2018 in South Korea